The Diocese of Reno is a Latin Church ecclesiastical territory or diocese of the Catholic Church in the northern Nevada region of the United States, centered on the city of Reno. The diocese is composed of 12 counties in Nevada.

The See of Reno is a suffragan diocese of the ecclesiastical province of San Francisco. Other suffragan sees in the province include the Dioceses of Honolulu, Las Vegas, Oakland, Sacramento, Salt Lake City, San Jose, Santa Rosa and Stockton.

Territory
The territory of the Diocese of Reno is composed of 12 Nevada counties:

Carson City
Churchill
Douglas
Elko
Eureka
Humboldt

Lander
Lyon
Mineral
Pershing
Storey
Washoe

History
At the urging of Cardinal George Mundelein, Archbishop of Chicago, Pope Pius XI established the Diocese on March 27, 1931. It was renamed as the Diocese of Reno-Las Vegas by Pope Paul VI, October 13, 1976. On March 21, 1995, Pope John Paul II reverted it to the Diocese of Reno while splitting Las Vegas, Nevada, into a new diocese.

Phillip Francis Straling officially retired on June 21, 2005, but continued to serve as apostolic administrator of the diocese.  On December 23, 2005, Pope Benedict XVI appointed Randolph Roque Calvo, of the Archdiocese of San Francisco, as the seventh Bishop of Reno.  Calvo, born in Agaña, Guam, is the first priest from Guam to head the diocese. Calvo was installed and ordained to the episcopate on February 17, 2006, by George Hugh Niederauer, Archbishop of San Francisco.

Bishops
The list of bishops of the diocese of Reno and their tenures of service:

Bishops of Reno
 Thomas Kiely Gorman (1931–1952), appointed Bishop of Dallas
 Robert Joseph Dwyer (1952–1967), appointed Archbishop of Portland in Oregon
 Michael Joseph Green (1967–1974)
 Norman Francis McFarland (1974–1976)

Bishops of Reno-Las Vegas
 Norman Francis McFarland (1976–1986), appointed Bishop of Orange
 Daniel F. Walsh (1986–1995), appointed Bishop of Las Vegas and later Bishop of Santa Rosa in California

Bishops of Reno
 Phillip Francis Straling (1995–2005)
 Randolph Roque Calvo (2006–2021)
 Daniel Henry Mueggenborg (2021–present)

Priests who became bishop of other dioceses
 Thomas Joseph Connolly, appointed Bishop of Baker in 1971

Constituent parishes
Corpus Christi (Carson City) - Carson City County
Saint Teresa of Avila (Carson City) - Carson City County
Fallon Naval Air Station Base Chapel (Fallon) - Churchill County
Saint Patrick's Catholic Church (Fallon) - Churchill County
Our Lady of Tahoe (Zephyr Cove) - Douglas County
Saint Gall Church (Gardnerville) - Douglas County
Sacred Heart (Carlin) - Elko County
Our Lady of Guadalupe (Jackpot) - (Mission Church) Elko County
Our Lady of the Rubies (Spring Creek)- Elko County
Saint Joseph's Church (Elko) - Elko County
Saint Thomas Aquinas (Wells) - Elko County
Saint Brendan's Church (Eureka) - Eureka County
Sacred Heart (McDermitt) - (Mission Church) Humboldt County
Saint Alfonsus (Paradise Valley) - (Mission Church) Humboldt County
Saint Paul's Church (Winnemucca) - Humboldt County
St Augustine Church (Austin) - (Station Church) Lander County
Saint John Bosco (Battle Mountain) - Lander County
Holy Family (Yerington) - Lyon County
Saint Ann's (Dayton) - Lyon County
Saint John the Baptist (Smith Valley) - (Mission Church) Lyon County
Saint Robert Bellarmine (Fernley) - Lyon County
Our Lady of Perpetual Help (Hawthorne) - Mineral County
Saint Michael (Mission) (Gabbs) - Nye County
Saint John the Baptist (Lovelock) - Pershing County
Saint Mary's in the Mountains (Virginia City) - Storey County
Holy Cross Catholic Church (Sparks) - Washoe County
Holy Spirit (Mission) (Washoe Valley) - Washoe County
Immaculate Conception Church (Sparks) - Washoe County
Our Lady of the Snows (Reno) - Washoe County
Our Lady of Wisdom (Reno) - Washoe County
Saint Albert the Great (Reno) - Washoe County
Saint Francis of Assisi (Incline Village) - Washoe County
Saint Joseph the Worker (Empire) - (Mission Church) Washoe County
Saint Michael's Church (Stead) - Washoe County
Saint Peter Canisius (Sun Valley) - Washoe County
Saint Rose of Lima (Reno) - Washoe County
Saint Therese of the Little Flower Catholic Church (Reno) - Washoe County
Saint Thomas Aquinas Cathedral (Reno) - Washoe County

Education

Superintendents 
 Br. Matthew Cunningham, FSR (1990–2000)
 Kitty Bergin (2002–2011)
 Karen Barreras (2011–present)

High school
Bishop Manogue High School, Reno

Elementary schools and preschools
Holy Child Learning Center, Reno - Preschool/Kindergarten
Little Flower School, Reno - Elementary School
Our Lady of the Snows School, Reno - Elementary School
Saint Albert the Great School, Reno -  Elementary School
Saint Albert the Great Child Development Center, Reno - Preschool/Kindergarten
St. Teresa of Avila School, Carson City - Kindergarten to Eighth Grade
St. Teresa of Avila Preschool - Carson City - Preschool

Hospitals
St. Mary's Regional Medical Center (Reno)

Outreach programs 

 Saint Vincents  Dining Room
 Catholic Charities of Northern Nevada

See also

 Catholic Church by country
 Catholic Church in the United States
 Ecclesiastical Province of San Francisco
 Global organisation of the Catholic Church
 List of Roman Catholic archdioceses (by country and continent)
 List of Roman Catholic dioceses (alphabetical) (including archdioceses)
 List of Roman Catholic dioceses (structured view) (including archdioceses)
 List of the Catholic dioceses of the United States

References

External links
Roman Catholic Diocese of Reno Official Site
Roman Catholic Archdiocese of San Francisco

 
Christian organizations established in 1931
Culture of Reno, Nevada
Reno
Reno
1931 establishments in Nevada